The 2018 Women's World Draughts Championship match at the international draughts was held 19–30 November 2018 in Riga (Latvia) International Draughts Federation FMJD between world champion 2017 Zoja Golubeva (Latvia) and world champion 2016 Natalia Sadowska (Poland). Natalia Sadowska won second title. Prize money 17 000€ (10 000€ for winner and 7000€ for loser). If score will be 54:54 both players will receive equally.

Rules
The match consists of 9 micro-matches, one per day.

First game of the micro-matches — standard game 1 hour 20 min + 1 min per move. For victory 12 points, for lost 0 points 12:0.

If draw at 1st game — rapid game 20 min + 5 sec per move. For victory 8 points, for lost 4 points 8:4.

If draw at rapid game — blitz game 5 min + 3 sec per move. For victory 7 points, for lost 5 points 7:5.

If draw score of micro-matches 6:6.

If after 9 days score is 54:54 title get to player with better score in standard games, if equality – title get to player with better score in rapid games. If equality — deciding tie-break will be played on the next day. The tie-break consists of unlimited number of games until first victory. First four games will be played as a rapid game (20’+5”), since game number 5th blitz games (5’ +3”) will be played until the end.

If one of the player will get more than 54 points, match will be finished.

Results

See also
List of women's Draughts World Championship winners
Women's World Draughts Championship

References

External links
Official site
Result on site KNDB
Матч за звание чемпионки мира по международным шашкам Зоя Голубева - Наталья Садовска. Рига 2018

2018 in draughts
Draughts world championships
2018 in Latvian sport
International sports competitions hosted by Latvia
November 2018 sports events in Europe
Sports competitions in Riga